The Blue Bird Café fire was a nightclub fire on September 1, 1972, in Montreal, Quebec, Canada. In all, 37 people were killed as a result of arson.

The fire was the worst in Montreal since 1927, when 77 people perished in the Laurier Palace Theatre Fire. It is also the worst and only nightclub fire casualty in Canadian history.

Venue 
Montreal’s Blue Bird Café and the Wagon Wheel, a country and western bar above it, were located on the west side of Union Street between Ste-Catherine Ouest and Dorchester (now René-Lévesque) in downtown Montreal, lying within the borough of Ville-Marie. The café and bar were known as places where largely working-class, English-speaking youth could come for an evening of music, dancing, and drinking.

Fire 

On the evening of Friday, September 1, 1972, the beginning of the Labour Day weekend, more than 200 people were at the bar celebrating. Around 10:45 PM, three young men (initial reports said four) were refused entry to the upstairs bar, as they appeared excessively intoxicated.  Upset by this, Gilles Eccles, James O’Brien and Jean-Marc Boutin set a fire on the staircase that served as the only regular entrance or exit for the Wagon Wheel's customers. "It was either a Molotov cocktail or gasoline spread on the stairs and then ignited," said Montreal Police Inspector Armand Chaille.  The entire bar was in flames within a few minutes, according to police.

With the primary escape route blocked by the fire advancing upward toward the crowded bar, its patrons sought out other exits. However, conflicting city building codes and fire regulations had left the upstairs bar with too few fire exits for its capacity of patrons. With the bar's main exit aflame and its sole fire exit blocked, patrons were forced to use one of two escape routes: either through the kitchen onto a folding fire escape (the emergency exit was chained) or by climbing through a window in the women's restroom and dropping some 20 feet onto a parked car. 

At its peak, the fire was fought by more than 50 firefighters.  Five firefighters would be injured by smoke inhalation before the fire was declared out.  At the time, the wearing of self-contained breathing apparatus (SCBA) was a relatively new practice and not as common among firefighters as it is today. The fire was brought under control by 2:30 a.m., and extinguished by daybreak.

Victims 
While it was originally reported that 42 people had died, later investigation determined that 37 people succumbed and perished as smoke and fire overtook the bar. Police and firefighters found bodies in the washrooms, huddled in a corner that had no exit, and jammed in a rear section of the club close to a back entrance.

Aftermath 
At 3:30 a.m. Eccles was arrested and a manhunt was on for Boutin and O'Brien. They were arrested in Vancouver, British Columbia two weeks later.

In the aftermath of the fire, regulations throughout Canada were strengthened to provide for more avenues of escape.  Two of the three defendants were convicted of second-degree murder, the third manslaughter. All three were paroled within a decade of their convictions. Owing to the blocked fire exit, a lawyer for the victims' families proposed a $9 million civil lawsuit against the Montreal fire department, bar owner Leopold Paré, and the building's owner, with the defence led by Montreal mayor Jean Drapeau.  The families eventually accepted a much lower settlement offer of $1,000 to $3,000 per victim.

On August 31, 2012, a memorial was unveiled by the city of Montreal to mark the 40th anniversary. A mass was held as well as a march by families of the victims along with a photo exhibit at city hall, with a vigil on September 1. As of May 2022 the memorial has been installed at the south side of Phillips Square following the renovation of the square. A 50th anniversary memorial is planned for September 1, 2022.

See also
List of fires in Canada
Denmark Place fire, 1980 London fire started by drunken patron refused entry by lighting gasoline in front of main entrance and only exit; also killed 37
Happy Land fire, 1990 New York City fire started in same fashion by ejected club patron; killed 87, making it the worst single-perpetrator mass murder in the city's history.
Knights of Columbus Hostel fire
L'Isle-Verte nursing home fire

References

External links
 

Building and structure fires in Canada
Nightclub fires
Disasters in Quebec
Fire disasters involving barricaded escape routes
1972 fires in North America
Arson in Canada
Mass murder in 1972
Crime in Montreal
1970s in Montreal
1972 in Quebec
Nightclubs in Montreal
September 1972 events in Canada
1972 murders in Canada
Mass murder in Canada
Attacks on nightclubs